The Walrus class was a class of two submarines that served between 1953 and 1971 in the Royal Netherlands Navy. They were former Balao class submarines that were loaned to the Netherlands by the United States under the Mutual Defense Assistance Program (MDAP).

Background 
After the Second World War the Royal Netherlands Navy (RNN) was left with several old and obsolete submarines. While the RNN made several plans to modernize the submarine fleet, it took many years till these plans resulted in the construction and commissioning of new submarines. In the meanwhile the RNN tried to loan some of the surplus submarines that allies such as the United Kingdom and United States (US) had. In the early 1950s this led to the US loaning two submarines to the Netherlands under the Mutual Defense Assistance Program (MDAP), which together would later form the Walrus class. Initially the US agreed to loan the two submarines for a duration of five years, however, this was extended twice with five years.

Design and construction 
The two submarines of the Walrus class were build in the US by the Manitowoc Shipbuilding Company. They were originally Balao class submarines that had served in the United States Navy (USN). Before both submarines were transferred from the USN to the RNN they had undergone a extensive modernization known as Greater Underwater Propulsion Power Program (GUPPY).

Propulsion 
Both Walrus class submarines were equipped with four 16 cylinder two-stroke GMC diesel engines that were capable of delivering around 6500 hp when surfaced and 2700 hp when submerged. This allowed the two submarines to reach a speed of 19 kn when surfaced and 12 kn when submerged. Furthermore, they each had two propellers and two 126 cells batteries. The batteries had a capacity of 10.500 Ah and allowed the Walrus class submarines to operate solely on electric power for 5 hours.

Armaments 
When it came to armaments both submarines were equipped with a total of ten 53.3 cm torpedo tubes of which six were located at the front and four at the rear. In addition, there was enough room to store 24 torpedoes inside the submarines.

Service history 
In the early 1960s the Walrus class submarines patrolled the waters in Dutch New Guinea and were stationed at Manokwari and Biak.

Ships in class

Notes

Citations

References

Walrus-class submarines (1953)